The Aston Martin Valkyrie (also known by its code-names as AM-RB 001 and Nebula) is a limited production hybrid sports car collaboratively built by British automobile manufacturers Aston Martin, Red Bull Racing Advanced Technologies and several others.

The sports car is a product of collaboration between Aston Martin and Red Bull Racing to develop a track-oriented car entirely usable and enjoyable as a road car, conceived by Adrian Newey, Dr Andy  Palmer, Christian Horner and Simon Spoule. The car's makers claim the title of fastest street-legal car in the world for it. Adrian Newey, Red Bull Racing's Chief Technical Officer and the world's most successful F1 designer aided in the design of the car.

Its main competitors are the Mercedes-AMG ONE and the Gordon Murray Automotive T.50. The start of the 2019 Formula One British Grand Prix, the car made a lap of the Silverstone circuit for the first time.

Aston Martin also announced a spider variant; only 85 will be produced. Production is expected to begin in 2023 for the spider variant.

Nomenclature 
The original codename was Nebula, an acronym for Newey, Red Bull and Aston Martin. The name AM-RB 001 was chosen as the final codename, and was decided since Aston Martin and Red Bull Racing had collaborated all throughout the project. AM stands for Aston Martin, and RB stands for Red Bull. 001 may be a possible reference to it being the first production car the two have collaborated on.

In March 2017, Aston Martin revealed that the car would be named Valkyrie, after the Norse mythological figures who guide the souls of Nordic soldiers fallen on the battlefield, leading them in one of two paths, choosing one half going to Odin's Valhalla, and one half going to Goddess Freyja's afterlife Fólkvangr. According to Red Bull, the name was chosen to continue the tradition of "V" nomenclature of Aston Martin's automobiles and to distinguish the vehicle as a high-performance car (the "V" was used as the distinguishing factor).. The Aston Martin Valhalla, which is known as "Son of Valkyrie", likewise has its origin in Norse Mythology, with the Gods Hall (home to King of the Gods and Supreme God Odin Allfather) bearing the name Valhalla.

Design

Exterior 

A show car was initially unveiled to the public in order to give the public an idea of its design. The design was nearly finished at the time in a near-production-ready form.

The exterior of the car is extremely aerodynamic for a sports car, with an extensively open underfloor, that works on the principle of the Venturi effect and is capable of producing  of downforce at high speed. Gaps on top of the car (for example, above the front axle and the roof intake) and a large front splitter aid in generating downforce. The wheels are also designed to manage the airflow and be as light as possible at the same time.

Interior 

The interior design was leaked online on 20 June 2017 and gave a preview of the car's design. The interior has no gauge cluster, but rather a collection of screens. By the left and right corners are the screens for the camera side mirrors. One screen sits at the top of the center console, which may have a collection of live vehicle information, and regular vehicle controls, but this is not confirmed. A screen is used on the race-inspired steering wheel and acts as the driver gauge cluster. Dials and switches sit beside the wheel screen to allow for easier changes without driving interruption. The seats, formed from hollow carbon fibre straight into interior perimeter, are bucket variants, and have two seat belts for each car seat.

Because of the extremely small interior and doors (which are practically roof-only hatches), each seat is designed specifically for the owner's body shape through 3D scanning. A removable steering wheel provides slightly more space for entry and exit.

Specifications

Valkyrie 
In February 2017, Aston Martin revealed most of the vehicle's specifications. The final specifications were revealed later in the year.

Several manufacturers (other than Aston Martin and Red Bull) have taken part in the Valkyrie's construction, those being Cosworth, Ricardo, Rimac Automobili, Multimatic, Alcon, Integral Powertrain Ltd, Bosch, Surface Transforms, Wipac, HPL Prototypes and Michelin.

This will make it the most powerful naturally-aspirated engine ever to be fitted to a production road car, as well as the highest-revving. With a KERS-style boost system akin to those fitted to F1 cars, the Aston Martin Valkyrie’s hybrid system has been developed by two main technical partners; Integral Powertrain Ltd, who supplied the bespoke electric motor, and Rimac for the lightweight hybrid battery system.

As a result, the full hybrid system contributes an additional 160 bhp of power and a further 280 N⋅m of available torque with the certified max power output of Aston Martin Valkyrie standing at  @ 10,500rpm. Equally, with the full hybrid system, peak torque will stand at 900 N⋅m (664 lbf⋅ft) @ 6,000 rpm

The car can accelerate to 60 mph (97 km/h) from a standstill in a time of 2.6 seconds.

The exhausts exit at the top of the car, near the engine, similar to those of Formula One cars and the Porsche 918 Spyder.

Bosch supplies the Valkyrie's ECU unit, traction control system, and ESP. The braking system is provided by Alcon and Surface Transforms. The front and rear lights are manufactured by Wipac. The car has all-carbon fibre bodywork and is installed with a carbon fibre Monocell from manufacturer Multimatic. Michelin supplies the Valkyrie with the company's high-performance Sport Cup 2 tyres, having sizes of 265/35-ZR20 at the front and 325/30-ZR21 at the rear. The wheels are constructed out of lightweight magnesium alloy (20" front, 21" rear) with race-spec centre-lock wheel nuts to reduce mass. In 2020, after Red Bull Racing's Red Bull Racing RB16 had its first shakedown in Silverstone Circuit, drivers Max Verstappen and Alexander Albon drove the car around the track.

Valkyrie AMR Pro 

The track-only variant of the Valkyrie called the Valkyrie AMR Pro was introduced at the 2018 Geneva Motor Show. Only 25 units will be produced, all of which have already been sold. The AMR Pro uses the same 6.5-litre naturally-aspirated V12 engine as used in the Valkyrie road car without the KERS system. The engine will also be modified, which means the AMR Pro will have up to 1,100 (est. 1,160-1,300) horsepower; more than its road-legal counterpart.

The AMR Pro uses smaller 18-inch wheels at the front and rear. This is to allow the Michelin racing tyres (based on LMP1 race cars) to fit the car, with F1-inspired carbon-carbon brakes to aid braking performance. The air-conditioning system and infotainment screens have been removed, and have been replaced with racing counterparts. The car will be able to generate 3.3 g lateral force during cornering and 3.5 g during braking. The car's exhaust will have very minimal parts to silence the engine.

In 2021, the production-intent AMR Pro was unveiled, having a significantly more aggressive design, with an LMP1-style rear aerodynamic fin, a large dual-element rear wing, and a large rear diffuser. In terms of this production-intent design, it looks more similar to the regular (but elongated) Valkyrie, than it did with the original concept.

Production
The road car's production will be limited to 150 units at a unit price of USD 3 million.
The AMR Pro production will be limited to 25 units at a unit price of USD 3.5 million. Both versions have sold out.

In an Autocar interview (22 May 2021), Aston Martin's CEO indicated that a convertible version could also be launched in 2022. This is likely to be reserved for buyers of the Coupé version.

Ten cars, fewer than planned, were delivered in the last quarter of 2021, causing the company to miss its profit target. The company said that this only affected timing, all production had been sold but not yet delivered. The Aston Martin Valkyrie Spider was two times oversubscribed.

Resale policy 
Aston Martin CEO Andy Palmer announced a policy in a Twitter post on 4 July 2017, stating that if the owner were to "flip" the car (buy and sell quickly to make a profit), the owner would not be provided the opportunity to buy any further special edition models from Aston Martin. This policy is also used for Ford's new GT and Mercedes-AMG's ONE sports cars.

Media
In March 2022, at the opening round of the 2022 Formula One World Championship at the Bahrain International Circuit, the Valkyrie AMR Pro was driven for two laps.

Car show appearances 
In July 2016, the Valkyrie was unveiled as a non-working full-scale model in Aston Martin's headquarters in Gaydon.
In November 2016, the car was featured in a private Aston Martin showcase at the Etihad Towers in Abu Dhabi, the day before the 2016 Formula One Abu Dhabi Grand Prix.
From December 2016 to February 2017, the car was featured in the 2017 Festival Automobile International in Paris.
In February 2017, the car was featured as the star car in the 2017 Canadian International Auto Show in Toronto.
In March 2017, the Valkyrie was featured at the Aston Martin stand along with the new Vanquish S Volante, the Rapide S AMR, and the V8 Vantage AMR-Pro at the 2017 Geneva Motor Show in Geneva, Switzerland.

See also
List of production cars by power output
Rimac Automobili
Mercedes-AMG One

References

External links

Valkyrie @ Aston Martin

Valkyrie
Cars introduced in 2017
Automobiles with gull-wing doors
Rear mid-engine, rear-wheel-drive vehicles